Brotherhood is the debut studio album by American R&B group 3T. The album was released in 1995 through MJJ Music and 550 Music.

Background
Produced by their uncle Michael Jackson, who also served as the executive producer with Kenneth Komisar, the album was released on Jackson's record label MJJ Music. In 1997, after 3T completed their tour, a Limited European Tour Edition was released that included a remix CD. The album was dedicated to the memory of the band's mother, Delores Vilma "Dee Dee" Jackson (April 1, 1955 – August 27, 1994).

Commercial performance
Brotherhood sold three million copies worldwide. The album peaked at #127 on the US Billboard 200, while in the UK it peaked at #11 on the UK Albums Chart. Six singles were released: "Anything", "24/7" ", "Tease Me", "Why" (a duet with Michael Jackson), "I Need You" (with Michael Jackson on backing vocals) and "Gotta Be You".

Track listing

 signifies a co-producer
 signifies a remixer

Credits
 Percussion – Paulinho Da Costa
 Guitar – Chuck Anthony
 Drums – Jody Cortez
 Guitar, Bass, Organ – Dean Pleasants
 Percussion – Luis Conte
 Acoustic Guitar – Dean Parks
 Drums – Jonathan Moffett
 Drum Programming – Mark Morales
 Keyboards – Mark C. Rooney

Charts and certifications

Weekly charts

Year-end charts

Certifications

B-Sides
 "What Will It Take" (featured on singles "Anything" and "Why")
 "Didn't Mean To Hurt You" (featured on single "Why")

References

1995 debut albums
3T albums
550 Music albums
Albums produced by Michael Jackson
Albums produced by Max Martin
Albums recorded at Cheiron Studios